Luděk Sobota (born 27 May 1943, Prague) is a Czech stand-up comedian and actor. He studied at Faculty of Theatre. He had his own theatre in Prague, Divadlo Ludka Soboty (Theatre of Luděk Sobota), which was located near the metro station I. P. Pavlova. He was in a comedy trio with Petr Nárožný and Miloslav Šimek. He is also known for providing voice-acting for the protagonist in the pavel video game series.

Filmography (selected) 
 1974 - Jáchyme, hoď ho do stroje!
 1982 - Srdečný pozdrav ze zeměkoule
 2012 - Okresní přebor - Poslední zápas Pepika Hnátka

Theatre performances
 2006 Ze Soboty "znovu" na Šimka
 2006 Facky místo pohádek
 2006 Směšná šou Luďka Soboty
 2005 Kouzlo vánoc
 2005 Dokonalý večer Krampola a hostů
 2004 Duševní hyena
 2001 Šlamastyky Luďka Soboty
 1995 Sobota není z Skamene
 1990 Muž v dívčí škole
 1985 Sobota, kanál číslo 1
 1982 Náměsíčná sonáta
 1980 Návštěvní den č.7
 1978 Celaskon a Cyankali
 1977 Dva pestré týdny v oblastním muzeu
 1976 Robinson Kreutznauer potom a Šípková Růženka napřed
 1975 Návštěvní den č.6
 1973 Jemný mrav
 1973 Třetí nejlepší představení na světě aneb Zázrak

External links
 Official Website
 His Myspace
 

1943 births
Czech male stage actors
Czech comedians
Living people
Male actors from Prague
Czech male video game actors
Recipients of Medal of Merit (Czech Republic)
20th-century Czech male actors
21st-century Czech male actors
Czech male film actors
Czech male television actors